Jeevitha Samaram is a 1971 Indian Malayalam film, directed by Sathyan Bose and produced by Tharachand Bharjathya. The film stars B. G. Jagirdar, Dharmendra, Kanyalal and Leela Chitnis in the lead roles. The film had musical score by Laxmikant Pyarelal.

Cast

B. G. Jagirdar
Dharmendra as Ashok Tandon / Bikram Sher Singh 
Kanyalal
Leela Chitnis as Mrs. Tandon 
Master Bunty as Shankar
Rajendranth
Ramesh Dev
Sabnam
Seb Rehman
Vipin Gupta
Rakhi as Deepa Tandon

Soundtrack
The music was composed by Laxmikant Pyarelal and the lyrics were written by P. Bhaskaran.

References

External links
 

1971 films
1970s Malayalam-language films
Films directed by Satyen Bose